Kelly Wilson (born 1985), is a female Australian basketball player

Kelly Wilson may also refer to:
Kelly Schmedes (née Kelly Wilson, born 1983), American soccer player
Kelly-Anne Wilson (born 1975), South African fencer
Kelly Pace-Wilson (born 1973), American tennis player
Kelly Wilson, of the Wilson sisters, New Zealand horse trainers

See also
 Disappearance of Kelly Dae Wilson for the American female teenager who was last seen in 1992